WWL (870 kHz) is a U.S. AM radio station in New Orleans, Louisiana, owned by Audacy, Inc. The station has a talk radio format with sports talk at night. Studios are at the 400 Poydras Tower in the New Orleans Central Business District.

WWL is a clear channel station, operating with 50,000 watts around the clock from a transmitter site in Estelle, Louisiana. The daytime signal provides at least secondary coverage to large parts of the Gulf Coast, with city-grade coverage reaching as far east as Pensacola, Florida, and as far west as Lafayette, Louisiana. At night it can be heard across much of the central and southern United States, and, with a good radio, as far north as Minneapolis.

Since April 2006, WWL has been simulcast on WWL-FM 105.3 MHz, and is also carried on that station's HD1 signal. 

WWL is the Louisiana Primary Entry Point for the Emergency Alert System (EAS), and with sister station WLMG is responsible for activations of the Southeast Louisiana EAS plan.

Programming

WWL is a long-time affiliate of the CBS Radio Network. The weekday schedule features news and talk programming mornings and early afternoons, shifting to sports talk and live play-by-play after 4 p.m. All weekday programming from 5 a.m. to midnight is hosted by local WWL personalities and reporters. The only nationally syndicated programs are paranormal show Beyond Reality at 11 p.m., family finances expert Dave Ramsey at 1 a.m. and This Morning, America's First News with Gordon Deal, an hour of early morning news, at 4 a.m. WWL continues to cover the post-Hurricane Katrina rebuilding of New Orleans and the Gulf Coast region with local news and talk programming.

Weekend programming includes shows on money, law, gardening, home improvement, cars and dining before sports takes over the schedule. Most hours on weekdays begin with local newscasts branded as WWL First News, while CBS News Radio begins most hours on nights and weekends.

Sports
As a part-time CBS Sports Radio affiliate, programming from that network is heard Friday and Saturday nights, and in several blocks during the day and evening on Sunday. When two live sporting events occur at the same time, WWL moves one of the games to its sister station, WWWL, which switched to a mostly sports format in November 2006.

WWL has for many years been the flagship station for broadcasts of New Orleans Saints football games, continuously since the 1995 season. Jim Henderson and ex-Saint Hokie Gajan were the broadcast team from 2000 until Gajan's death from cancer on April 11, 2016. Prior to the 1998 NFL Draft, when son Peyton Manning was drafted by the Indianapolis Colts, Archie Manning provided commentary on WWL's Saints coverage from his retirement as a player in 1985 through 1997.

Former Saint Deuce McAllister succeeded Gajan as Henderson's color commentator in 2016. Longtime Saints offensive tackle Stan Brock was Henderson's commentator in 1998 and 1999.

WWL is also the New Orleans outlet of the LSU Tigers, simulcasting all football games on both the AM and FM signals while men's basketball and baseball games air on either station. It shares flagship status with Baton Rouge's WDGL; the AM station can be heard at city-grade strength in the capital. It was previously the radio home of the Tulane Green Wave.

History

Effective December 1, 1921, the Commerce department, which regulated radio at this time, adopted regulations formally establishing a broadcasting station category, which set aside the wavelength of 360 meters (833 kHz) for entertainment broadcasts, and 485 meters (619 kHz) for farm market and weather reports. On March 31, 1922 Loyola University in New Orleans was issued a Limited Commercial license for a new station on the 360 meter "entertainment" wavelength. The station call letters, WWL, were randomly assigned from a roster of available call signs. WWL was the second broadcasting station licensed in the state of Louisiana, following WGV, also in New Orleans, licensed 10 days earlier. However, WWL was the first station in the state to begin broadcasting operations.

Starting before World War One and continuing until June 1922, the university sponsored a radio training school, with both civilian and military students. WWL's initial equipment was installed at Marquette Hall on the Loyola campus, with construction performed by Edward T. Cassidy, a Jesuit seminarian and physicist serving as the current head of the Radio School, and L. J. N. "Joe" du Treil, a former school head who now worked at the Commerce Department's New Orleans district office of its Radio Service section. 

WWL received a telegraphed authorization on March 31, 1922, and began broadcasting on the shared 360 meter entertainment wavelength, as a 10-watt station, on the same day. The station's primary initial purpose was to promote a university fundraising project. Loyola president Father Edward Cummings opened the first half-hour broadcast with a three minute fundraising plea on behalf of the University's building drive, stating that "We are organizing the radio operators in the state to spread the story of Loyola's needs. Will you lend your support to our campaign, both by radio and individual effort which will aid us in making Loyola University one of the greatest institutions of learning in the Southland?" This was followed by Tulane's Guiseppe Ferrate playing an original piano composition.

In mid-1923, the station was reassigned to 1070 kHz, which was changed to 1090 kHz in early 1925, and to 1220 kHz in late 1927. On November 11, 1928, under the provisions of the Federal Radio Commission's General Order 40, WWL was assigned to 850 kHz, on a sharetime basis with KWKH in Shreveport. As part of the equal distribution standards mandated by the Davis Amendment, each of five regions had been allocated eight high-powered "clear channel" frequencies, which were granted dominant and widespread nighttime coverage. 850 kHz was one of the frequencies assigned to "Region 3", consisting of states in the southeastern United States. WWL's power was increased to 5,000 watts on March 31, 1929, following the installation of a new transmitter in Bobet Hall.

In 1929 the decision was made for WWL to include commercial operations, with the station profits providing an endowment for the university. Loyola University is affiliated with and run by Catholic priests belonging to the Society of Jesus, commonly known as "Jesuits". There was concern that commercial operation might violate both Catholic and Jesuit prohibitions on priests operating businesses. However, a decision was made that the station's non-religious programming and advertising had an existing analogy in church-run efforts, such as publications, which had content that included advertising. In addition, a separate holding company, WWL Development, was formed to run the station, with the provision its profits would be transferred to Loyola.

In 1932, the station upgraded to 10,000 watts, with new studios in the Roosevelt Hotel. In 1934, WWL's contentious application to gain fulltime use of 850 kHz was granted, which resulted in its timeshare partner, KWKH, being moved to 1100 kHz. WWL's attainment of fulltime operations made the station attractive to the national radio networks, and it began an affiliation with the CBS Radio Network on November 1, 1935, which had been previously held by WDSU. This also greatly increased the profits being transferred to the university. 

On November 30, 1938, WWL formally dedicated a power increase to 50,000 watts. On March 29, 1941, with the implementation of the North American Regional Broadcasting Agreement, stations on 850 kHz, including WWL, moved to 870 kHz. In the 1940s, 1950s, and 1960s, the station was famous for the live broadcasts of local Dixieland jazz bands, including such notables as Papa Celestin, Sharkey Bonano, Irving Fazola, Tony Almarico, and Lizzie Miles.

An FM companion station, WWLH at 100.3 MHz, debuted on September 11, 1946, but ended operations on February 28, 1951, because "We have been unsuccessful in establishing in New Orleans a sufficient audience of FM listeners to justify continued operation." A television partner WWL-TV came on the air on September 7, 1957, which was also affiliated with CBS. A new FM companion station, WWL-FM at 101.9 MHz (now WLMG), debuted on March 15, 1970 with its own music format.

WWL was mentioned in an opening scene of "The Swan Bed" (October 21, 1960) episode of the Route 66 TV series, when Todd and Buzz turn on the car's radio as they are driving across the Greater New Orleans Bridge and hear the call letters announced.

Starting on March 14, 1971, WWL was home to a long-running overnight country music program aimed at truck drivers called The Road Gang.  It used the slogan "Interstate 87", and offered strip weather in major cites along the east-west interstates I-10, I-20, I-30, etc. Advertising was focused on long-haul truckers. It was originally hosted by Charlie Douglas. Later hosts included Dave Nemo and Big John Parker. The station helped popularize southern gospel by late-night broadcasts of the Mull Singing Convention. 

WWL's transmitter site was moved from Kenner, Louisiana, on the south shore of Lake Pontchartrain, to Estelle, Louisiana, in 1975.

Loyola sold WWL, WLMG-FM, and WWL-TV to separate companies in 1989 to build the university endowment. That same year, the university began operating  carrier current station "WLDC". Using the electrical grid as a antenna, this station's power was low enough to be limited to campus reception, so it did not need an FCC license. It was subsequently replaced by Crescent City Radio, an internet radio station broadcasting from the Communications/Music Complex on the corner of Calhoun and Saint Charles Avenue.

Keymarket Communications of Greenville, South Carolina, became the new owner of WWL and WLMG-FM. Baltimore, Maryland-based Sinclair Broadcast Group assumed ownership of both stations in 1996; most of Sinclair's radio stations, including WWL, were acquired by Entercom Communications of Bala Cynwyd, Pennsylvania in 1999.

WWL has been "monogrammed" into the Internal Revenue Code. A section excluding certain types of income of nonprofit organizations from income tax mentions entities licensed by federal agencies (like the station's FCC license) and carried on by religious orders (like the Jesuits). The three subsections of this tax provision, 26 U.S.C. 512(b)(15), begin with W, W, and L, respectively.  The exclusion was directed at WWL specifically, and the joke has been attributed to Senator Russell Long of Louisiana.

In April 2006, WWL programming returned to the FM band, via simulcasting on WWL-FM 105.3.

In 2021 WWL simulcast its Hurricane Ida coverage on all of its Audacy sister stations.

Hurricane Katrina (2005)
During the immediate effects and aftermath of Hurricane Katrina on New Orleans and the Gulf Coast in late August 2005, WWL was for a time one of the few if not only radio station(s) in the area remaining on the air. Announcer Garland Robinette for a time kept broadcasting from an improvised studio built in a closet after the studio's windows were blown out.

After the hurricane, WWL's emergency coverage was simulcast on the frequencies of numerous other radio stations. The broadcast was named "The United Radio Broadcasters of New Orleans"; mostly WWL staff appeared on-air. The United Radio Broadcasters were a partnership between Entercom (now Audacy, Inc.) and competitor Clear Channel Communications. The WWL website was completely rebuilt in only one day by the staff of other Entercom stations.  The company also dispatched staffers from stations throughout the country to help WWL, and to provide their own stations coverage from the hurricane ravaged New Orleans area. For some time after Hurricane Katrina, WWL was simulcast on shortwave outlet WHRI, owned by World Harvest Radio International.

References

External links
 
 
 (covering 1922-1979)

Further reading
 Enterprise in Radio: WWL and the Business of Broadcasting in America by C. Joseph Pusareti, 1980. 

WWL
News and talk radio stations in the United States
Radio stations established in 1922
1922 establishments in Louisiana
Audacy, Inc. radio stations
Clear-channel radio stations
Radio stations licensed before 1923 and still broadcasting